Hyperoxia occurs when cells, tissues and organs are exposed to an excess supply of oxygen (O2) or  higher than normal partial pressure of oxygen.

In medicine, it refers to excessive oxygen in the lungs or other body tissues, which can be caused by breathing air at pressures greater than normal atmospheric pressure, or breathing gas mixtures whenever the alveolar oxygen partial pressure is greater than that due to breathing air at normal atmospheric pressure, which can be a consequence of high oxygen fraction, high ambient pressure or a combination of ambient pressure and oxygen fraction resulting in an oxygen partial pressure significantly higher than that of sea level air. The body is tolerant of some deviation from normal inspired oxygen partial pressure, but a sufficiently elevated level of hyperoxia can lead to oxygen toxicity over time, with the mechanism related to the partial pressure, and the severity related to the dose. Hyperoxia is the opposite of hypoxia; hyperoxia refers to a state in which oxygen supply to the tissues is excessive, and hypoxia refers to a state in which oxygen supply is insufficient.

Supplementary oxygen administration is widely used in emergency and intensive care medicine and can be life-saving in critical conditions, but too much can be harmful and affects a variety of pathophysiological processes. Reactive oxygen species are known problematic by-products of hyperoxia which have an important role in cell signaling pathways. There are a wide range of effects, but when the homeostatic balance is disturbed, reactive oxygen species tend to cause a cycle of tissue injury, with inflammation, cell damage, and cell death. 

In the environment, hyperoxia refers to an abnormally high oxygen concentration in a body of water or other habitat.

Signs and symptoms
Associated with hyperoxia is an increased level of reactive oxygen species (ROS), which are chemically reactive molecules containing oxygen. These oxygen containing molecules can damage lipids, proteins, and nucleic acids, and react with surrounding biological tissues. The human body has naturally occurring antioxidants to combat reactive molecules, but the protective antioxidant defenses can become depleted by abundant reactive oxygen species, resulting in oxidation of the tissues and organs.

The symptoms produced from breathing high concentrations of oxygen for extended periods have been studied in a variety of animals, such as frogs, turtles, pigeons, mice, rats, guinea pigs, cats, dogs and monkeys. The majority of these studies reported the occurrence of irritation, congestion and edema of the lungs, and even death following prolonged exposures.

Oxygen toxicity

The supplementation of oxygen can lead to oxygen toxicity, also known as oxygen toxicity syndrome, oxygen intoxication, and oxygen poisoning. There are two main types of oxygen toxicity: central nervous system (CNS) toxicity, and pulmonary and ocular toxicity.

Temporary exposure to high partial pressures of oxygen at greater than atmospheric pressure can lead to central nervous system toxicity (CNS). An early but serious sign of CNS oxygen toxicity is a grand-mal seizure, also known as a generalized tonic-clonic seizure. This type of seizure consists of a loss of consciousness and violent muscle contractions. Signs and symptoms of oxygen toxicity are usually prevalent, but there are no standard warning signs that a seizure is about to ensue. The convulsion caused by oxygen toxicity does not lead to hypoxia, a side effect common to most seizures, because the body has an excess amount of oxygen when the convulsion begins. The seizures can lead to drowning, however, if the convulsion is suffered by a diver still in the water.

Prolonged exposure to higher oxygen levels at atmospheric pressure can lead to pulmonary and ocular toxicity. Symptoms of oxygen toxicity may include disorientation, respiratory problems, myopia, or accelerated development of cataracts. Prolonged exposure to higher than normal partial pressures of oxygen can result in oxidative damage to cell membranes. Signs of pulmonary (lung) oxygen toxicity begin with slight irritation in the trachea. A mild cough usually ensues, followed by greater irritation and a worse cough until breathing becomes quite painful and the cough becomes uncontrollable. If supplementation of oxygen is continued, the individual will notice tightness in the chest, difficulty breathing, shortness of breath, and if exposure is continued, fatality due to lack of oxygen.

Cause
Oxygen supplied at greater than atmospheric pressure has been known to damage plants, animals, and aerobic bacteria such as Escherichia coli. The damaging effects vary depending on the specimen used, its age, physiological state, and diet.

Evidence indicates that hyperoxia may be harmful, but robust data from interventional studies is limited. 

The supplementation of oxygen has been a common procedure of pre-hospital treatment for many years. Guidelines include cautions about chronic obstructive pulmonary disease (COPD). These guidelines stress the use of 28% oxygen masks and caution the dangers of hyperoxia. Long-term use of supplemental oxygen improves survival in patients with COPD, but can lead to lung injury.

An additional cause of hyperoxia is related to underwater diving with breathing apparatus. Divers breath a mixture of gasses which must include oxygen, and the partial pressure of oxygen in any given gas mixture will increase with depth. Atmospheric air becomes hyperoxic during the dive, and a hyperoxic gas mixture known as nitrox is used to reduce the risk of decompression sickness by substituting oxygen for part of the nitrogen content. Breathing nitrox can lead to oxygen toxicity due to the high partial pressure of oxygen if used too deep or for too long. Protocols for the safe use of raised oxygen partial pressure in diving are well established and used routinely by recreational scuba divers, military combat divers and professional saturation divers alike. The highest risk of hyperoxia is in hyperbaric oxygen therapy, where it is a high probability side effect of the treatment for more serious conditions, and is considered an acceptable risk as it can be managed effectively without apparent long term effects.

Oxygen rebreathers are also used for normobaric routine work and emergency response in non-breatheable atmospheres, or in circumstances where the suitability of the ambient gas for breathing is unknown or may change without warning, such as firefighting, underground rescue, and work in confined spaces. Supplemental oxygen is also used for high altitude exposures in aviation and mountaineering. In all these cases, the maximum concentration is naturally limited by the ambient pressure, but the lower limit is usually more difficult to control, and the immediate consequences of hypoxia are generally more serious that the immediate consequences of hyperoxia, so there is a tendency to provide a larger margin for error for hypoxia, and the user is exposed to hyperoxic conditions for much of the time.

Mechanism

Supplementary oxygen is an effective and widely available treatment for hypoxemia and hypoxia associated with many pathological processes, but other pathophysiological processes are associated with increased levels of reactive oxygen species (ROS) caused by hyperoxia.  These ROS react with biological tissues, and may damage proteins, lipids, and nucleic acids. Antioxidants normally protecting the tissues can be overwhelmed by higher levels of ROS, thereby causing oxidative stress.

Alveolar and alveolar capillary epithelial cells are vulnerable to injuries caused by oxygen free radicals due to hyperoxia. In acute lung injuries of this type, hyperpermeability of the pulmonary microvasculature allows plasma leakage, causing pulmonary edema and abnormalities in coagulation and fibrin deposition. Surfactant production can be impaired. Maximum benefit of oxygen availability is a balance between necessity and toxicity along a continuum.

Cumulative oxygen dose is determined by a combination of exposure time, ambient pressure and oxygen fraction of the inhaled gas. The latter two factors can be combined as the partial pressure of inhaled oxygen in the alveoli. Partial pressures of inhaled oxygen exceeding 0.6 bar (FIO2 >0.6 at normal atmospheric pressure), administered for extended periods in the order of days, are toxic to the lungs, which is known as low pressure oxygen poisoning, pulmonary toxicity, or the Lorraine Smith effect. This form of exposure  leads to lung airway congestion, pulmonary edema and atelectasis caused by damage to the linings of the bronchi and alveoli. Fluid accumulation in the lungs causes a feeling of shortness of breath, a burning sensation is felt in the throat and chest, and breathing is painful. At normal atmospheric pressures the effect is mainly confined to the lungs as they are directly exposed to the high concentration of oxygen, which is not distributed throughout the body as transport is limited by the hemoglobin-oxygen buffer system, and relatively little oxygen is carried in solution in the plasma. At higher ambient pressures, and higher oxygen partial pressures, where a larger amount of oxygen is carried in solution, toxic effects on the central nervous system manifest over a much shorter exposure time. This is known as high pressure oxygen poisoning, or the Paul Bert effect.

Diagnosis
Diagnodis is generally simplified by a known history of exposure to intentionally raised concentrations of oxygen. There are few circumstances where a person would be unaware of exposure to higher than normal oxygen dosage.

Treatment
Oxygen supplementation is used to treat tissue hypoxia and to relieve arterial hypoxemia. High concentrations of oxygen are often given to patients with chronic obstructive pulmonary disease (COPD) or acute lung injury (ALI). Supplementing oxygen is known to cause tissue damage, with toxicity increasing with the increase of oxygen concentrations and exposure pressures. Unfortunately, the supplementation of oxygen is necessary if an individual is not able to obtain sufficient oxygen through respiration and perfusion. To decrease the chances of hyperoxia, the therapist should use the lowest concentration of oxygen required by an individual. There are no known alternatives to oxygen supplementation.

Prevention

Diving

Divers can be at risk from both central nervous system and pulmonary oxygen toxicity, and the risks have been well researched. Protocols have been developed which impose limits on oxygen partial pressure in the breathing gas which expose the diver to acceptable overall risks, bearing in mind that convulsions and loss of consciousness underwater on scuba equipment often lead to death by drowning. Diving with surface supplied gas using a helmet or full-face mask protects the airway much more than a demand valve held by the teeth, and in some circumstances slightly higher partial pressures and a slightly higher risk of oxygen toxicity may be acceptable. There is a trade-off between risk from longer decompression obligations which keep the diver in the water longer, versus oxygen toxicity.

In  the exposure time is usually insufficient to develop symptoms of pulmonary toxicity, and the intervals between dives are usually long enough for recovery, so oxygen partial pressure (PO2) is commonly selected to maximise no-stop time or minimise decompression time as in-water decompression in cold water tends to be stressful to the diver. In saturation diving, where the diver will be breathing the gas mixture under pressure for periods in the order of weeks to a month, the PO2 must be kept low enough to avoid pulmonary toxicity, and allow downward excursions from storage pressure, while being high enough to allow for possible contingencies involving temporary reduction of pressure, during which it is highly desirable that the affected divers remain conscious and are able to perform necessary tasks to minimise the consequences, and to allow for upwards excursions without requiring a gas switch. A partial pressure of around 0.4 bar has been found to satisfy these conditions.

Hyperbaric medicine

Critical care and emergency medicine
Supplemental oxygen is one of the most commonly used treatments for critical illness and is routinely used in treatment in acute shock and other emergency medicine, but the optimum dosage is seldom obvious, and during mechanical ventilation, anesthesia, and resuscitation supply usually exceeds physiological requirements, to avoid a deficit. The resulting excess to requirements can be detrimental, but usually less so than an overall hypoxic state. Careful titration of the oxygen supply while monitoring oxygenation can allow sufficient tissue oxygenation without hyperoxic harm.

Long term oxygen therapy
At atmospheric pressure there is no risk of acute oxygen toxicity, but the possibility of pulmonary toxicity exists, and hyperoxia can exacerbate some of the conditions for which supplementary oxygen provision is otherwise beneficial.

Prognosis

Epidemiology

See also

References

Oxygen
Respiratory diseases
Diving medicine